Battle of Changzhou occurred during the Taiping Rebellion. It was won by the Qing dynasty, who regained control over all of Jiangsu.

References
  Detailed narrative analysis.
 

Changzhou 1864
Changzhou 1864
Changzhou 1864
Military history of Jiangsu
Conflicts in 1863
December 1863 events
January 1864 events
February 1864 events
March 1864 events
April 1864 events
May 1864 events